Tadworth railway station is a passenger railway station serving the large suburban village of Tadworth in Surrey, England, on the North Downs.

Status 
This is the penultimate station on the Tattenham Corner Line. Train services and the station are operated by Southern. The station opened as a temporary terminus on 1 July 1900, when the railway line was extended from Kingswood. The line was extended to Tattenham Corner, opening on Derby Day on 4 June 1901. The extension required relatively costly cuttings (even with cheap labour). The course taken, brought the railway branch through the centre of Tadworth, before turning sharply north. 

Since at least World War II the start point for trains has been from London Bridge station.

Amenities

There are separate platforms for 'down' trains north to Tattenham Corner and 'up' trains to Purley and London, linked by a road overbridge at the south end of the station on which is located the former station building.

Services 
All services at Tadworth are operated by Southern using  EMUs.

The typical off-peak service in trains per hour is:
 2 tph to 

On Sundays, the service is reduced to hourly and runs between Tattenham Corner and  only. Passengers for London Bridge have to change at Purley.

It was initially proposed that from 2018, when the Thameslink Programme was completed, services on this line would be operated with larger 12 car trains offering all day direct services to  via . However, by September 2016, these proposals had been dropped; instead, services on the Tattenham Corner Line "remain as Southern South London Metro services with increased capacity as compared to today".

Ticketing 

There are self-service ticket machines at the London-bound platform entrance (without rural PERTIS 'Permit to Travel' option). Oyster Card readers are provided on both platforms.

References

External links 

Railway stations in Surrey
Former South Eastern Railway (UK) stations
Railway stations in Great Britain opened in 1900
Railway stations served by Govia Thameslink Railway